The Cambé River, commonly called the Cambezinho, is a river of Paraná state in southern Brazil, flowing through Cambé municipality. It is a tributary of the Três Bôcas River.

See also
List of rivers of Paraná

References

Rivers of Paraná (state)
Londrina